FC Shakhtar Horlivka was a Ukrainian football club from Horlivka, Donetsk Oblast. Since its relegation from professional leagues in 2000, the club participated in the regional competitions of Donetsk Oblast until the War in Donbass. The club is associated with the coal mining company Artemvuhillya (Artemugol) out of Horlivka.

During the Soviet times, the club participated mostly in the republican competitions of the Soviet Ukraine including the competitions of the Soviet Second League.

Brief history
The club was created back in 1913 as the Football Association of the Gorlovka Artillery Works (FOGAZ). After the World War I and the Russian Civil War, the club was revived and until 1926 competed under its original name. In 1926 it was renamed into FC Metalist Horlivka. In 1928 the club was merged with another club from Horlivka, FC Hirnyk Horlivka, as FC Metalist Horlivka. The same year the club won its regional championship and qualified for the Ukrainian finals that took place in Kharkiv. In the finals FC Metalist placed second after the newly created FC Dynamo Kharkiv (descendant of FC Shturm and FC RabIs).

In 1934-1936 the club played as FC Dynamo Horlivka when 1936 it was merged with Dynamo Stalino into FC Vuhilnyky Horlivka (better known as FC Ugolshchiki Gorlovka) and later participated in the Soviet competitions as Stakhanovets Stalino. In 1938 FC Vuhilnyky Horlivka was revived and participated in the Ukrainian republican competitions until 1959. Sometime after the World War II the club was renamed from FC Avanhard Horlivka to FC Shakhtar Horlivka.

League and cup history

Soviet Union
{|class="wikitable"
|-bgcolor="#efefef"
! Season
! Div.
! Pos.
! Pl.
! W
! D
! L
! GS
! GA
! P
!Domestic Cup
!colspan=2|Europe
!Notes
|-
|align=center|1987
|align=center|3rd
|align=center|10
|align=center|52
|align=center|22
|align=center|13
|align=center|17
|align=center|67
|align=center|58
|align=center|57
|align=center|
|align=center|
|align=center|
|align=center|Zone 6
|-
|align=center|1988
|align=center|3rd
|align=center|26
|align=center|50
|align=center|8
|align=center|8
|align=center|34
|align=center|37
|align=center|91
|align=center|24
|align=center|
|align=center|
|align=center|
|align=center|Zone 6, Relegated
|-
|align=center|1989
|align=center|4th
|align=center|5
|align=center|24
|align=center|12
|align=center|3
|align=center|9
|align=center|28
|align=center|24
|align=center|27
|align=center|
|align=center|
|align=center|
|align=center|Group 6
|-
|align=center|1990
|align=center|4th
|align=center|7
|align=center|28
|align=center|11
|align=center|7
|align=center|10
|align=center|30
|align=center|23
|align=center|29
|align=center|
|align=center|
|align=center|
|align=center|Group 6
|-
|align=center|1991
|align=center|4th
|align=center|4
|align=center|30
|align=center|13
|align=center|8
|align=center|9
|align=center|41
|align=center|31
|align=center|34
|align=center|
|align=center|
|align=center|
|align=center|Group 6
|}

Ukraine
{|class="wikitable"
|-bgcolor="#efefef"
! Season
! Div.
! Pos.
! Pl.
! W
! D
! L
! GS
! GA
! P
!Domestic Cup
!colspan=2|Europe
!Notes
|-
|align=center|1992–93
|align=center|3rd (lower)
|align=center|13
|align=center|34
|align=center|9
|align=center|8
|align=center|17
|align=center|33
|align=center|44
|align=center|26
|align=center|
|align=center|
|align=center|
|align=center|Relegated
|-
|align=center|1993–94
|align=center|4th
|align=center bgcolor=silver|2
|align=center|26
|align=center|17
|align=center|5
|align=center|4
|align=center|36
|align=center|18
|align=center|39
|align=center|
|align=center|
|align=center|
|align=center|Zone 5, Promoted
|-
|align=center|1994–95
|align=center|3rd (lower)
|align=center|18
|align=center|42
|align=center|11
|align=center|3
|align=center|28
|align=center|29
|align=center|73
|align=center|36
|align=center|
|align=center|
|align=center|
|align=center|Relegated
|-
|align=center rowspan=3|1997–98
|align=center rowspan=3|4th
|align=center bgcolor=tan|3
|align=center|14
|align=center|9
|align=center|1
|align=center|4
|align=center|20
|align=center|14
|align=center|28
|align=center rowspan=3|
|align=center rowspan=3|
|align=center rowspan=3|
|align=center|Group 4
|-
|align=center bgcolor=silver|2
|align=center|4
|align=center|2
|align=center|0
|align=center|2
|align=center|3
|align=center|4
|align=center|6
|align=center|Group B
|-
|align=center bgcolor=gold|1
|align=center|2
|align=center|2
|align=center|0
|align=center|0
|align=center|2
|align=center|1
|align=center|6
|align=center|Play-off, Promoted
|-
|align=center|1998–99
|align=center|3rd
|align=center|11
|align=center|26
|align=center|8
|align=center|3
|align=center|15
|align=center|18
|align=center|39
|align=center|27
|align=center|
|align=center|
|align=center|
|align=center|Group B
|-
|align=center|1999–00
|align=center|3rd
|align=center|13
|align=center|26
|align=center|2
|align=center|5
|align=center|19
|align=center|11
|align=center|13
|align=center|11
|align=center|
|align=center|
|align=center|
|align=center|Group B, Relegated
|}

Honours
 Championship of Ukraine
 Runners-up (3): 1928, 1932 (as Donbas), 1969
 Ukrainian Cup
 Runner up (1): 1976

References

External links
 Official website

 
Defunct football clubs in Ukraine
Sport in Horlivka
Football clubs in Donetsk Oblast
Association football clubs established in 1913
Association football clubs disestablished in 2014
1913 establishments in Ukraine
2014 disestablishments in Ukraine
Football clubs in the Ukrainian Soviet Socialist Republic
Shakhter Voluntary Sports Society
Mining association football teams in Ukraine